is a Japanese football player. She plays for Ehime FC and Japan national team.

Club career
Oya was born in Midori on November 8, 1994. She joined Ehime FC in 2011.

National team career
On April 9, 2017, Oya debuted for Japan national team against Costa Rica. She played 9 games for Japan until 2018.

National team statistics

References

External links

Japan Football Association

1994 births
Living people
Association football people from Gunma Prefecture
Japanese women's footballers
Japan women's international footballers
Nadeshiko League players
Ehime FC Ladies players
Women's association football forwards